Hong Kong competed at the 1980 Summer Paralympics in Arnhem, Netherlands. 11 competitors from Hong Kong won 3 medals, 1 silver and 2 bronze, and finished joint 35th in the medal table with The Bahamas.

See also 
 Hong Kong at the Paralympics

References 

Hong Kong at the Paralympics
1980 in Hong Kong sport
Nations at the 1980 Summer Paralympics